The South Carolina Public Charter School District (often shortened to SCPCSD) is a school district based in Columbia, South Carolina that currently includes thirty four public charter schools across the state of South Carolina.  The district has approximately 17,100 students.

Governance and funding
The South Carolina Public Charter School District is semi-unique in the United States for being one of the only statewide public school districts.

The SCPCSD is not funded through local funding (property taxes), which means that when a student attends a public school in the district, the South Carolina Public Charter School District is not given funding for educating that child.  Instead, the local school district is provided the local funding for the student even though the student does not attend a school in the local district.  To help account for the disparity, the South Carolina legislature appropriates a per pupil amount through an annual budget proviso-- $3,600/student for those attending a brick-and-mortar school, $1,900 for those enrolled in a virtual school and 4,300/student for those enrolled in a special education program.

While public charter schools are sometimes mistaken for private schools, all public charter schools in the United States are authorized and operated by public school authorities.  In the case of the South Carolina Public Charter School District, by law the schools within the district are considered to be the same as any other public school district in South Carolina, independent of the South Carolina Department of Education.

Another way for a public charter school to open in South Carolina is through the auspices of a local public school district, but many such traditional districts are extremely hesitant to open public charter schools for a variety of reasons.  The SCPCSD was created as a charter school authorizer by the South Carolina Legislature as an alternative method for public charter schools to be approved for operation in the state.  The state legislature did this, in part, to resolve various legal questions regarding resource allocation for public charter schools in local districts.  In addition, the legislature hoped that a little competition with local school districts might lead to greater reform for the state's historically lagging public school system.

Schools
The district oversees the following public schools, of which some are traditional "brick and mortar" schools and some are virtual schools:

Many of the district's virtual learning schools use an education management company.  In some states, these companies are for-profit, yet in South Carolina these companies are prohibited by law from being for-profit.  The schools are actually different entities than the management companies that serve the schools.  For example, Palmetto State e-Cademy changed its education management company in 2009, which demonstrates that the school is broader than the hired management company.  Palmetto State e-Cademy later decided that it could operate without an EMO and has been operating that way for the last two years.  In practice, the line between school and education management company can be difficult to see, but the law in South Carolina is clear in making an operational and organizational distinction between the education management companies and the schools.

References

External links
Official site

School districts in South Carolina